The 1993–94 season of the Balkans Cup club tournament was the last season of the competition before it was abolished. It was won by Turkish side Samsunspor in the final against Greek PAS Giannina for their first title in the competition.

Semi-finals

|}

First leg

Second leg

PAS Giannina won 5–1 on aggregate.

Samsunspor won 4–1 on aggregate.

Final

|}

First leg

Second leg

Samsunspor won 5–0 on aggregate.

References

1993–94
1993–94 in European football
1993–94 in Albanian football
1993–94 in Bulgarian football
1993–94 in Greek football
1993–94 in Turkish football